The Wealdway, Kent and East Sussex, is a public footpath that runs for 83 miles / 134 km from Gravesend, Kent on the Thames estuary, to the A259 at Eastbourne, 3 km north of Beachy Head.

Interrelation with other long-distance routes
This is the only north-south route from the Thames Estuary east of London and west of the Medway Towns.  It crosses the North Downs, Higher and Lower, Kentish and Sussex Weald (see Kent long distance walks here) and starts at Gravesend. Here there is a regular ferry link to Tilbury and routes north of the Thames.  At the south is Eastbourne the start of the South Downs Way overlooking the south coast. The route provides access to coast routes: a return circuit for users of the Saxon Shore Way.

History
The Wealdway was conceived in 1970 by members of the Ramblers' Association.  The first route descriptions were published in the mid seventies, but the poor state of the rights of way between Uckfield and Eastbourne delayed publication until 1981. Motorway Construction work and the building of the Tonbridge Flood Relief Barrier forced many changes to the original route.

Route

From the Thames Estuary
The route goes through Gravesend; crosses the A2 at Tollgate; goes southward through Sole Street and Luddesdown; climbs to the North Downs Way at Trottiscliffe/Vigo Village; descends the scarp slope of the North Downs; crosses the M20 and A20; goes through Platt and Mereworth Woods to Gover Hill, where the Medway valley comes into view; goes down to West Peckham, Barnes Street and thus to the Medway; takes the riverside path upstream for a full , through Tonbridge to Hayesden; heads due south, under the railway and under the Tonbridge bypass; climbs to the ridge at Bidborough through to Modest Corner, Southborough; and follows a mixture of paths and roads to the A264, at Stone Cross.

From the Kent borders

External links

 Ramblers' Association.

References

Geography of Sussex
Geography of Kent
Tourist attractions in Kent
Wealden District
Long-distance footpaths in England
Footpaths in Kent
Ashdown Forest